Thomas Gallagher (1918 – December 19, 1992) was an American writer and seaman known for his writing on disasters and military heroism. He won a Edgar Award in 1960 and was a National Book Award for Fiction finalist in 1953.

Biography 
Gallagher was born in Manhattan in 1918. He graduated from Columbia College in 1941 and served in Iran during World War II with the Army Corps of Engineers and became a seaman in the United States Merchant Marine, when he began to write.

Gallagher's book Fire at Sea (1959), an investigation into the 1934 SS Morro Castle disaster, received an Edgar Award for Best Fact Crime in 1960. His book The Gathering Darkness (1952), which traced a family whose life were upended after the 1929 Stock Market Crash, was a National Book Award for Fiction finalist in 1953.

Gallagher died on December 19, 1992, in Manhattan.

References 

1918 births
1992 deaths

People from Manhattan
Writers from Manhattan
Columbia College (New York) alumni
Edgar Award winners
20th-century American writers